The 27th Biathlon World Championships held in 1992 in Novosibirsk, Russia were only for the team events because these were not part of the Olympic programme in Albertville. This was also the first time when this event was organised in Asian continent.

Men's results

Team event
Date: 22 March 1992.

Women's results

Team event
Date: 22 March 1992.

Medal table

References

Turun Sanomat 23.3. 1992

1992
World Championships
International sports competitions hosted by Russia
1992 in Russian sport
March 1992 sports events in Russia
Biathlon competitions in Russia
Sport in Novosibirsk